Zé Ramalho Canta Beatles is the fifth tribute album by Brazilian solo artist Zé Ramalho, and the fourth consecutive one. This time, he pays a tribute to The Beatles, including six tracks from all members' solo careers. The album cover is inspired by the cover of their With the Beatles album.

It is not the first time Ramalho covers The Beatles. Before releasing albums, he made shows in small parties of Paraíba (his state of origin) in which he performed Beatles songs. Later, he also released covers of "The Fool on the Hill" and "This Boy".

Track listing

References 

 Album at Ramalho's official website

2011 albums
Zé Ramalho albums
The Beatles tribute albums